Matilethrips is a genus of thrips in the family Phlaeothripidae.

Species
 Matilethrips inermis

References

Phlaeothripidae
Thrips
Thrips genera